Pierre Le-Tan (1950 - 2019) was a French illustrator and painter.

Biography 
Pierre Le-Tan was born on June 5, 1950, in Neuilly-sur-Seine, Paris to a Vietnamese father and French mother. His father Lê Phổ (1907-2001), was a painter and came to Paris to complete his studies at Beaux-Arts de Paris in 1937. Pierre learnt to draw from his father. It was on an American friend of his mother that he sent his drawings to the New Yorker. At age 17, Le-Tan was commissioned by the New Yorker Magazine for his first cover, which would mark the beginning of a long collaboration with many other American publications, such as Vogue, The Atlantic, Madame Figaro, Fortune and Harper's Bazaar. Spanning over more than 50 years, Le-Tan's career included from set design for films and theaters, to designing over 100 book covers and film posters. He passed away on September 17, 2019 Villejuif.

References 

1950 births
2019 deaths
20th-century French painters
21st-century French painters
Children's book illustrators
Editorial cartoonists
French production designers
The New Yorker people